Edith Cross Jensen (née Cross; August 2, 1907 – July 15, 1983) was an American tennis player who achieved a No. 3 national ranking in 1928, 1929 and 1930.

Career 
Cross, originally from San Francisco, began to play tennis after graduating from high school in 1927.
In 1930, she won the U.S. National Championships mixed doubles title with Wilmer Allison after a straight-sets victory in the final against Marjorie Morrill and Frank Shields. She reached the U.S. National Championships doubles final in 1928 and 1930 with Anna Harper. In 1930, she reached the final of the doubles event at Wimbledon with Sarah Palfrey, losing to Helen Wills and Elizabeth Ryan in straight sets.

In 1928 and 1931, she won the singles title at the  Pacific Coast Championships. In 1931, she won the singles title at the Canadian Championships, defeating Marjory Leeming in straight sets.

She was part of the American team that won the Wightman Cup against Great Britain 1929. Cross won her singles match against Peggy Michell, but lost her doubles match with Helen Wills against Phoebe Holcroft Watson and Peggy Michell.

In 1976, she was inducted into the USTA Northern California Tennis Hall of Fame.

Grand Slam finals

Doubles (3 runners-up)

Mixed doubles (1 title, 1 runner-up)

References

External links
GrandSlamHistory.com – Player Profile

American female tennis players
Grand Slam (tennis) champions in mixed doubles
Tennis players from San Francisco
1907 births
1983 deaths
United States National champions (tennis)
20th-century American women
20th-century American people